Nicole Cowgill Jaffe (born May 23, 1941) is a retired Canadian actress, best known as the original voice actress for Velma Dinkley in Hanna-Barbera's Scooby-Doo Saturday morning cartoon series from 1969 to 1973.

Biography 
A life member of The Actors Studio, David – under her maiden name Nicole Jaffe – had previously appeared in The Trouble with Girls (1969) with Elvis Presley (and Scooby-Doo voice actor Frank Welker) and in Disney's The Love Bug (1968).

Jaffe starred in a 1969 stage production of You're a Good Man, Charlie Brown as Patty, where she was seen by Hanna-Barbera recording director Gordon Hunt, who auditioned her for and eventually cast her as Velma on Scooby-Doo, Where Are You! 

During the second season in 1970, after Stefanianna Christopherson, who voiced Daphne on Scooby-Doo, left the show, Jaffe recommended her roommate Heather North as a replacement; North voiced Daphne in various Scooby productions for the next three decades. Velma was Jaffe's only voice role, which she reprised in the spin-off series The New Scooby-Doo Movies (1972–74). During this time, Nicole also appeared in a starring role in the  Room 222 second season episode "What Would We Do Without Bobbie?" in 1970.

Jaffe retired from acting after marrying Actors Studio classmate Brad David in 1973 and went into talent representation. With Arnold Rifkin, Nicole David formed the Rifkin/David agency in 1982, which was merged two years later into the Triad Artists agency. Triad was sold to the larger William Morris Agency in 1992 for over $20 million. David worked as a senior agent and senior vice president at William Morris and its successor William Morris Endeavor until 2013; her clients over the years have included John Travolta, Whitney Houston, Lauryn Hill, and Elijah Wood. She temporarily returned to the Scooby-Doo series for two 2003 direct-to-video movies: Scooby-Doo! and the Legend of the Vampire and Scooby-Doo! and the Monster of Mexico.

Filmography

References

External links 

 

1941 births
Actresses from Montreal
Canadian film actresses
Canadian talent agents
Canadian voice actresses
Living people
20th-century Canadian actresses
21st-century Canadian actresses
Hanna-Barbera people